Gheorge Negrea (21 April 1934 – 2000) was a boxer from  Romania.

He competed for Romania in the 1956 Summer Olympics held in Melbourne, Australia in the light heavyweight event where he finished in second place.  He also competed in the 1960 Olympic boxing tournament in Rome, again in the light heavyweight division.  He was defeated in his quarterfinal match by Anthony Madigan of Australia.

1960 Olympic results
Below are the results of Gheorge Negrea, a light heavyweight boxer from Romania who competed in the 1960 Rome Olympics:

 Round of 32: bye
 Round of 16: defeated George Oywello (Uganda) by decision, 5-0
 Quarterfinal: lost to Anthony Madigan (Australia) by a second-round knockout

References

External links

1934 births
2000 deaths
Sportspeople from Sibiu
Olympic boxers of Romania
Olympic silver medalists for Romania
Boxers at the 1956 Summer Olympics
Boxers at the 1960 Summer Olympics
Boxers at the 1964 Summer Olympics
Olympic medalists in boxing
Romanian male boxers
Medalists at the 1956 Summer Olympics
Light-heavyweight boxers